The 2010 Norwegian Football Cup was the 105th season of the Norwegian annual knockout football tournament. The competition started with two qualifying rounds on 11 April and 21 April, and the final was held on 14 November at Ullevaal Stadion. A total  of 127 games were played and 508 goals were scored. The defending champions were Aalesund.

The winners of the Cup, Strømsgodset, can call themselves Champions of Norway and qualified for the third qualifying round of the 2011–12 UEFA Europa League.

Calendar

First round 

|colspan="3" style="background-color:#97DEFF"|12 May 2010

|}

Second round 

|colspan="3" style="background-color:#97DEFF"|19 May 2010

|-
|colspan="3" style="background-color:#97DEFF"|20 May 2010

|}

Third round 
The games were played, in a one-leg format, on 9–10 and 30 June.

|colspan="3" style="background-color:#97DEFF"|9 June 2010

|-
|colspan="3" style="background-color:#97DEFF"|10 June 2010

|-
|colspan="3" style="background-color:#97DEFF"|30 June 2010

|}

Fourth round 
The draw was made on 11 June. The Games were played in a one-leg format.

|colspan="3" style="background-color:#97DEFF"|7 July 2010

|}

Quarter-finals

Semi-finals

Final

See also 
 2010 Tippeligaen

References

External links 
Official website
Cup Website

 
Norwegian Football Cup seasons
Cup
Norway